Guillermo Murray (15 June 1927 – 6 May 2021) was an Argentine actor. He also directed three films.

Selected filmography
 Alfonsina (1957)
 Planet of the Female Invaders (1966)
 La venus maldita (1967)
 The Chinese Room (1968)
 Flor marchita (1969)
 The Rebellious Novice (1971)
 Victoria (1972)
 The Truce (2003)
 My Mexican Shivah (2007)

References

Bibliography
 Goble, Alan. The Complete Index to Literary Sources in Film. Walter de Gruyter, 1999.

External links
 

1927 births
2021 deaths
Argentine male film actors
Argentine male television actors
Argentine emigrants to Mexico
People from Buenos Aires Province